Mark Stock (August 4, 1951 – March 26, 2014) was an American painter. He was born in Frankfurt, Germany, in 1951.  The son of an Army officer, Stock lived in many states across America before settling in St. Petersburg, Florida.  He received his Bachelor of Arts degree from the University of South Florida in Tampa, where he studied under Theo Wujcik.  Upon graduating in 1976, Stock was hired to work at Gemini G.E.L. in Los Angeles as a lithographer.  While there, he printed for notable artists such as Jasper Johns, David Hockney, Robert Rauschenberg, and Roy Lichtenstein before leaving to paint full-time.

Mark's final resting place is at the Mountain View Cemetery in Altadena, California. His tombstone depicts an image that he drew in 1977 of a tombstone in a wagon.

Ballet and modern dance
In 1977, Stock began studying ballet and modern dance. His work expanded to include designing sets for various Los Angeles-based dance companies.  He started to paint the figure in 1983 and has become widely known for his narrative paintings.

Paintings
Stock's works can be found in the permanent collections of Brooklyn Museum, Museum of Modern Art (New York and San Francisco), The Library of Congress and The National Gallery of Art.

Musician
Besides painting, Mark Stock was a jazz drummer whose trio performed regularly.  He was also an accomplished magician and a champion golfer.  He resided in Oakland, California.

Magician 
An avid amateur magician, Stock was known for performing his floating dollar bill trick.

References and external links 

www.theworldofmarkstock.com
www.modernisminc.com
Los Angeles Times - December 2013 review by Leah Ollman
Los Angeles Times - January 2000 review by Suzanne Muchnic
34th Telluride Film Festival poster artist
 Mark Stock: Paintings. 2000, Duane Press. .
www.loraschlesinger.com
Hollywood Uncovered
Actor and writer
The Butler's in Love based on the Mark Stock painting
Fleshtone (1994) writing contributor. Directed by Harry Hurwitz
Legacy.com Obituary from Tallahassee Democrat
Los Angeles Times Obituary
San Francisco Chronicle Obituary

1951 births
2014 deaths
20th-century American painters
American male painters
21st-century American painters
21st-century American male artists
Burials in California
20th-century American male artists